Fred DeBernardi (March 2, 1949 – December 3, 2020) was an American football defensive end and discus thrower. He played for the Kansas City Chiefs in 1974.

DeBernardi competed in the Masters So Cal Track and Field Championship  meet June 1979 and won the M55 Hammer Throw.

References

1949 births
2020 deaths
Sportspeople from Santa Clarita, California
Players of American football from California
American football defensive ends
UTEP Miners football players
Kansas City Chiefs players
American male discus throwers
Deaths from cancer in Nevada
American masters athletes